The Heavyweight competition was the second-highest weight class featured  at the 2009 World Amateur Boxing Championships, and was held at the Mediolanum Forum. Heavyweights were limited to a maximum of 91 kilograms in body mass.

Medalists

Seeds

  Osmay Acosta  (final)
  Clemente Russo (third round)
  Oleksandr Usyk (semifinals)
  John M'Bumba  (semifinals)
  Mohamed Arjaoui  (quarterfinals)
  Jahon Qurbonov  (second round)
  Tsolak Ananikyan  (first round)
  Jozsef Darmos (third round)

Draw

Finals

Top Half

Section 1

Section 2

Bottom Half

Section 3

Section 4

See also
Boxing at the 2008 Summer Olympics – Heavyweight

External links
Draw

Heavyweight